The Minnesota Curling Association is one of eleven regional associations of the United States Curling Association.

Member clubs

References

External links 

 Minnesota Curling Association
 United States Curling Association

Curling governing bodies in the United States
Curling in Minnesota